Tchart (or Teechart) is a charting library for programmers.

Tchart may also refer to:

 TAChart, a component for the Lazarus IDE that provides charting services
 T-chart, a chart of probability distributions

See also
 T Chartran (1849–1907), French propaganda painter and portrait artist